Charles, Prince of Löwenstein-Wertheim-Rosenberg may refer to:

 Charles, Prince of Löwenstein-Wertheim-Rosenberg (1834–1921)
 Charles, Prince of Löwenstein-Wertheim-Rosenberg (1904–1990), grandson of the preceding